Newtownhamilton is a small town and civil parish in County Armagh, Northern Ireland. It lies predominantly within Tullyvallan townland. The civil parish is within the historic barony of Fews Upper. In the 2011 Census it had 2,836 inhabitants.

The village is built around two narrow main streets (Armagh Street and Dundalk Street) and a main town square (The Square). Other places include Newry Street, Castleblaney Street (known locally as 'Blaney Hill'), Church Street also known as Shambles Lane  (known locally as the 'back street') and The Commons. Residential areas are Dungormley Estate, Meadowvale and the Nine Mile Road.

Name 
Before the Plantation of Ulster the area of Newtownhamilton was known as Tullyvallan. This comes from the Irish Tulaigh Uí Mhealláin meaning "Ó Mealláin's hillock".

The modern Irish name of Newtownhamilton is An Baile Úr, meaning "the new town"; a rarely used alternative is Baile Úr Uí Urmoltaigh ("the new town of Hamilton").

History 
On 9 May 1920, during the Irish War of Independence, some 200 Irish Republican Army volunteers under Frank Aiken surrounded and attacked the Royal Irish Constabulary barracks in Newtownhamilton. After a two-hour firefight, the IRA breached the barracks wall with explosives and stormed the building. The RIC refused to surrender until the building was set alight with petrol from a potato-spraying machine.

Newtownhamilton suffered significant disruption, damage and fatalities during The Troubles from the late 1960s to the 1990s. The deadliest incident was the Tullyvallen massacre. For more information, see The Troubles in Newtownhamilton. While the British Army had a major presence in the village during the conflict, this was scaled down and eventually removed entirely following the Good Friday Agreement. In 2006 it was announced that the local police station would be upgraded to full-time status.

Education 

Newtownhamilton High School
Newtownhamilton Primary School
St Michael's Primary School
Cortamlet Primary School (located outside Newtownhamilton)

Demography

2011 Census
Newtownhamilton is classified as a small town.	
On Census Day  (27 March 2011), in Newtownhamilton Ward, there were 2,836 people living in 956 households, giving an average household size of 2.97.
 26.09% were aged under 16 years and 10.93% were aged 65 and over;
 50.74% of the usually resident population were male and 49.26% were female; and
 32 years was the average (median) age of the population.
 99.44% were from white (including Irish Traveller) ethnic groups;
 62.41% belong to or were brought up in the Catholic religion and 34.77% belong to or were brought up in a 'Protestant and Other Christian (including Christian related)' religion; and
 30.18% indicated that they had a British national identity, 44.39% had an Irish national identity and 27.82% had a Northern Irish national identity. Respondents could indicate more than one national identity
 
Of the population aged 3 years old and over:
 
 14.99% had some knowledge of Irish;
 4.71% had some knowledge of Ulster-Scots; and
 2.63% did not have English as their first language.

2001 Census
On Census day 29 April 2001, there were 648 people living in Newtownhamilton.

Civil parish of Newtownhamilton
The civil parish contains the village of Newtownhamilton.

Townlands
The civil parish contains the following townlands:

Altnamackan
Ballynarea
Camly (Ball)
Camly (Macullagh)
Carrickacullion
Carrickrovaddy (also known as Dorsy (Macdonald))
Dorsy (Hearty)
Dorsy (Macdonald) (also known as Carrickrovaddy)
Dorsy (Mullaghglass)
Drumaltnamuck
Kiltybane (also known as Lisleitrim)
Lisleitrim (also known as Kiltybane)
Mullaghduff
Roxborough 
Skerriff (Tichburn)
Skerriff (Trueman)
Tullyogallaghan
Tullyvallan
Tullyvallan (Hamilton) East
Tullyvallan (Hamilton) West
Tullyvallan (Macullagh)
Tullyvallan (Tipping) East
Tullyvallan (Tipping) West
Ummerinvore

See also 
List of towns and villages in Northern Ireland
List of civil parishes of County Armagh

References

Sources
Culture Northern Ireland

Villages in County Armagh
 
The Troubles in County Armagh